Robert Semmens (born 5 December 1961) is a former Australian rules footballer who played with Richmond and Footscray in the Victorian Football League (VFL).

Semmens, at the age of 15, represented the Tasmanians Schoolboys at the 1977 Jubilee National Football Carnival. The team went undefeated and in 2013 was induced into the Tasmanian Football Hall of Fame as a "legendary" team.

In the early 1980s, Semmens played in the VFL, making five appearances for Richmond and seven for Footscray.  In between his stints at those two clubs he played for Norwood in the South Australian National Football League.

Semmens then played with Williamstown in the Victorian Football Association.

He competed in the Hampden Football Netball League in 1990, for Cobden, where he still lives.

References

1961 births
Australian rules footballers from Tasmania
Richmond Football Club players
Western Bulldogs players
East Launceston Football Club players
Williamstown Football Club players
Cobden Football Club players
Norwood Football Club players
Living people